This is a list of National Historic Landmarks and comparable other historic sites designated by the U.S. government in the U.S. state of New York.  The United States National Historic Landmark (NHL) program operates under the auspices of the National Park Service, and recognizes buildings, structures, objects, sites and districts of resources according to a list of criteria of national significance. There are 276 NHLs in New York state, which is more than 10 percent of all the NHLs nationwide, and the most of any state. The National Park Service also has listed 20 National Monuments, National Historic Sites, National Memorials, and other sites as being historic landmarks of national importance, of which 7 are also designated NHLs. All of these historic landmarks are covered in this list.

There are 139 NHLs in upstate New York, 13 on Long Island, and 116 within New York City (NYC).  Three counties have ten or more NHLs: New York County (Manhattan) has 86; Westchester County, just north of NYC, has 18; and Erie County in western New York has 10. Twelve other counties have five to nine NHLs, eight have three or four, 27 counties have one or two, and the remaining twelve of the state's 62 counties have none. The first New York NHLs were eight designated on October 9, 1960; the latest was designated on January 13, 2021. The NHLs and other landmarks outside NYC are listed below; the NHLs in NYC are in this companion article.

Seven NHL sites are among the 20 National Park System historic areas in New York state.  The other 13 National Park Service areas are also historic landmark sites of national importance, but are already protected by Federal ownership and administration, so NHL designation is unnecessary. A list of these National Park Service areas that conserve historic sites in New York State is also provided. Finally, three former NHLs in the state are also listed.

Overview

New York State NHLs include ten prehistoric or other archeological sites, 12 historical Dutch farmhouses, manors, and historic districts, and 21 architecturally and/or historically important churches or houses of worship. Fully 26 NHLs are primarily military, including 13 fort sites (five standing forts, three fortified houses, and five ruins), five other battlegrounds, seven military headquarters, training facilities, arsenals and armories, and one military shipwreck site. One of these NHLs is associated with the American Civil War, while all the rest of these forts and other military places are associated with the French and Indian War and/or the American Revolutionary War.

There are nine NHL ships, including a warship and a tugboat that served in World War II, one warship that saw combat in the Vietnam War, three sailing boats, two fireboats and a lightvessel. Salient in the list are 24 mansions, and four sites primarily significant for their architectural landscaping. Many properties, numbering in the thousands, are contributing or non-contributing structures in the state's nine National Historic Landmark Districts. Intellectual accomplishments of New Yorkers are associated with 22 sites, including nine university buildings, ten other NHLs associated with inventions, inventors or scientists, and four engineering landmarks, including two bridges that were once the longest of their types. Commercial accomplishments include 11 historic skyscrapers, five of which were once the tallest in the world, seven stock exchanges and other buildings important in commercial history, two bank buildings, five industrial facilities, and three water-based civil engineering works. Two are architectural oddities.

Political and social accomplishments are represented by four former mental care institutions (a legacy of the state's leading role in mental health care), 14 sites associated with suffragettes or other women leaders, five Underground Railroad or other sites associated with abolitionists, six sites associated with African-American leaders, three sites associated with labor rights, and four sites associated with other social activism. In addition, there are 21 homes of other national leaders, and six government buildings that are significant on a national scale. Community, arts and entertainment accomplishments represented include two utopian communes, the Adirondack Park and four of its Great Camps, and five other retreat sites. No fewer than nine artist homes or studios are landmarked, as well as nine homes of writers and composers. There are four club buildings, of which two are historical societies, and eight entertainment venues or sites associated with entertainers. Sixteen others are unique sites that are difficult to classify.

Notable architects whose work is represented in the NHLs of the state include: Alexander Jackson Davis (7 sites), Andrew Jackson Downing (2), William West Durant (2), Leopold Eidlitz (2), Cass Gilbert (2), Henry J. Hardenbergh (2), Raymond Hood (3), Philip Hooker (2), Minard Lafever (7), John McComb Jr. (3), Frederick Law Olmsted (3), Isaac G. Perry (2), George B. Post (3), James Renwick, Jr. (4), Henry Hobson Richardson (2), Louis Sullivan (2), Richard Upjohn (6), Calvert Vaux (6), and Frederick Clarke Withers (2).  The firm McKim, Mead, and White participated in design of at least six buildings later declared to be NHLs. It was also that firm's work, Pennsylvania Station, whose pending demolition in 1963 launched a historic preservation movement in New York City and led to creation of the New York City Landmarks Preservation Commission in 1965.

Current National Historic Landmarks outside New York City

The state of New York, exclusive of NYC, is home to 155 of these landmarks, which are tabulated here.  Twenty-three of these are also State Historic Sites (SHS), and fourteen are National Park System areas; these designations are indicated in italics.

Key

|}

Current NHLs in New York City

New York City alone is home to 114 NHLs. The earliest was designated on October 9, 1960; the latest was designated on November 2, 2016.  Many of the NHLs in NYC are also landmarked individually or as part of districts by the New York City Landmarks Preservation Commission. See List of New York City Designated Landmarks.

Historic areas in the United States National Park System
National Historic Sites, National Historic Parks, National Memorials, and certain other areas listed in the National Park system are historic landmarks of national importance that are highly protected already, often before the inauguration of the NHL program in 1960.  There are 20 of these in New York State.  The legislation establishing the National Historic Landmark program does not prevent these from being designated, but in practice these are not often named NHLs per se, due to administrative costs of their nomination and to the low preservation value of designating them.

For the first 16 years of the National Historic Landmarks program, the National Park Service did not consider any sites already within the National Park system for NHL designation, and in fact if a NHL-designated site came into the NPS system it was de-designated.

In New York State, the William Floyd House within the Fire Island National Seashore and Ellis Island within the Statue of Liberty National Monument were both deemed NHL-eligible by the advisory board but were not designated.

It was not until 1977 that a policy was promulgated that would allow for designation of a National Historic Landmark "whose primary significance is not related to its park's purpose".  The Jacob Riis House in Queens was de-designated in 1973.

The National Park Service identifies 18 historic sites within national park units in New York State, and lists these together with the NHLs in the state, and there are also two National Historic Sites that are "affiliated areas," receiving National Park Service support but not directly administered by it.  Seven of the 20 were declared National Historic Landmarks, in several instances before receiving the higher protection designation, and retain their NHL standing.  Four of these are listed above and three are included within the New York City list of NHLs.  The 13 others are:

There are four other National Park Service areas in New York State that do not have historic standing.

NHLs formerly located in New York
The following Landmarks were located in New York at the time they were declared National Historic Landmarks, but have since moved to other states.

Former NHLs in New York

See also

Great Camps
Historic preservation in New York
List of National Historic Landmarks by state
List of National Natural Landmarks in New York
List of New York State Historic Sites
List of New York state parks § State historic sites
National Register of Historic Places listings in New York

Notes

References

External links

 (Note its count of 258 for New York mistakenly includes the absent Coast Guard cutter Fir.)
National Historic Landmarks Program, at National Park Service
National Park Service listings of National Historic Landmarks
1838 Peter Augustus Jay House

New York
 |National Historic Landmarks in New York
National Historic Landmarks